Wheeler Branch is a stream in Stone County in the Ozarks of southwest Missouri. It is a tributary of the James River.

The source area for the stream lie just east of Elsey and the stream flows east-southeast passing under Missouri Route AA prior to its confluence with the James.

Wheeler Branch has the name of the local Wheeler family.

See also
List of rivers of Missouri

References

Rivers of Stone County, Missouri
Rivers of Missouri